Godfrey Weston Zambi (born 12 June 1962) is a Tanzanian CCM politician and Former Member of Parliament for Mbozi East constituency since 2005. He served as a Mbozi MP for ten years. Region commissioner Lindi

References

1962 births
Living people
Chama Cha Mapinduzi MPs
Deputy government ministers of Tanzania
Tanzanian MPs 2005–2010
Tanzanian MPs 2010–2015
Sangu Secondary School alumni
Mzumbe Secondary School alumni
University of Dar es Salaam alumni